Manton Eastburn (1801 in Leeds, England – 1872) was an Episcopal bishop who served as the fourth Bishop of Massachusetts from 1843 till 1872.

Biography 
After graduation from Columbia University, he studied at the General Theological Seminary of the Episcopal Church in the United States before ordination as deacon on May 17, 1822 and priest on November 13, 1825 by Bishop John Henry Hobart of the Diocese of New York. After serving at Christ Church, New York, New York, he became the first rector of the Church of the Ascension, New York. On December 29, 1842, he was consecrated as assistant Bishop of Massachusetts; he served as diocesan bishop on the death of Alexander Viets Griswold from 1843 until his death.

Eastburn attended the first Lambeth Conference in 1867 and was associated with the evangelical school of Episcopalian churchmanship. His tenure as diocesan bishop was marked by considerable conflict over Tractarianism both locally and nationally, particularly at the Church of the Advent in Boston.

References
 A Sketch-book of the American Episcopate, by Hermon Griswold Batterson
 Correspondence between the Right Reverend the Bishop of Massachusetts and the Rectors of the Parish of the Advent Boston, A.D. 1845 to A.D. 1856.

External links
 Documents by Manton Eastburn from Project Canterbury
 https://www.flickr.com/photos/boston_public_library/5416021040/

1801 births
1872 deaths
Episcopal bishops of Massachusetts
19th-century American Episcopalians
19th-century American clergy